Utsunomiya Brex is a Japanese professional basketball team based in Tochigi Prefecture, Japan.  After winning the JBL 2 in 2008, the team  played in the National Basketball League.

In July 2015 it was announced that the team would compete in the first division of the new Japan Professional Basketball League (B.League), which started in October 2016. The team became the first champions of the B.League on 27 May 2017, defeating the Toshiba Kawasaki Brave Thunders by the final score of 85–79.

Roster

Notable players

Coaches
Yoshinori Kaneta
Mitsuhiko Kato
Jason Rabedeaux
Bruce Palmer
Antanas Sireika
Thomas Wisman
Kenji Hasegawa
Ryuzo Anzai
Norio Sassa
Darius Dimavičius (asst)
Michael Katsuhisa (asst)

Arenas
Brex Arena Utsunomiya
TKC Strawberry Arena
Tochigi Prefectural North Gymnasium
Tochigi Prefectural South Gymnasium

Practice facilities

TKC Strawberry Arena

References

External links

Team Profile

 
Basketball teams in Japan
Basketball teams established in 2006
Sports teams in Tochigi Prefecture
2006 establishments in Japan